Biroidakuni High School is a Catholic secondary school founded in 1941 by the Congregation of Holy Cross in the Diocese of Mymensingh in the Bengal region of India, now Haluaghat Union, Haluaghat Upazila, Mymensingh District, Bangladesh.

References

Holy Cross secondary schools
Catholic secondary schools in Bangladesh
Schools in Mymensingh District
Educational institutions established in 1941
1941 establishments in India